Gabriele Rossetti (born  7 March 1995) is an Italian shooter, the son of the Olympic medalist Bruno Rossetti. He represented his country at the 2016 Summer Olympics where he won the gold medal in skeet.

References

External links
 

1995 births
Living people
Italian male sport shooters
Shooters at the 2016 Summer Olympics
Olympic shooters of Italy
Olympic gold medalists for Italy
Olympic medalists in shooting
Medalists at the 2016 Summer Olympics
Skeet shooters
Sportspeople from Florence
Shooters at the 2019 European Games
European Games medalists in shooting
European Games gold medalists for Italy
European Games bronze medalists for Italy
Shooters of Fiamme Oro
Shooters at the 2020 Summer Olympics
21st-century Italian people